B-cell receptor-associated protein 29 is a protein that in humans is encoded by the BCAP29 gene.

References

External links

Further reading